Plasmodium sandoshami is a parasite of the genus Plasmodium subgenus Vinckeia. As in all Plasmodium species, P. sandoshami has both vertebrate and insect hosts. The vertebrate hosts for this parasite are mammals.

Taxonomy 
The parasite was first described by Dunn et al. in 1963.

This species was named after A. A. Sandosham, Department of Parasitology, Faculty of Medicine in Singapore, University of Malaya.

Distribution 
This species is found in Malaysia.

Hosts 
The only known host is the Sunda flying lemur (Galeopterus variegatus).

References 

sandoshami